The 2014 season is the 62nd season of competitive football in Singapore.

Promotion and relegation

Pre-season

Singapore national football team

2015 AFC Asian Cup qualification

International friendlies

Honours

 
Seasons in Singaporean football